Stage Entrance was an American variety show broadcast on the now-defunct DuMont Television Network. It aired in a 15-minute time-slot, a common time-slot during the 1950s.

Broadcast history
The series, hosted by Broadway columnist Earl Wilson, aired Mondays at 8pm ET from May 2, 1951, to March 2, 1952.

Episode status
As with most DuMont series, no complete episodes are known to exist.  A short clip exists of an episode from February 24, 1952 featuring Leonard Feather presenting awards from Downbeat to Charlie Parker and John Birks (Dizzy) Gillespie, and then a performance from Charlie Parker, Dizzy Gillespie, Dick Hyman, Sandy Block, and Charlie Smith.

See also
List of programs broadcast by the DuMont Television Network
List of surviving DuMont Television Network broadcasts
1951-52 United States network television schedule

References

Bibliography
David Weinstein, The Forgotten Network: DuMont and the Birth of American Television (Philadelphia: Temple University Press, 2004) 
Alex McNeil, Total Television, Fourth edition (New York: Penguin Books, 1980) 
Tim Brooks and Earle Marsh, The Complete Directory to Prime Time Network TV Shows, Third edition (New York: Ballantine Books, 1964)

External links
Stage Entrance at IMDB
DuMont historical website

DuMont Television Network original programming
1951 American television series debuts
1952 American television series endings
1950s American variety television series
Black-and-white American television shows
Lost American television shows